2228 Soyuz-Apollo, provisional designation , is a carbonaceous Themistian asteroid from the outer region of the asteroid belt, approximately 26 kilometers in diameter. It was discovered on 19 July 1977, by Soviet–Russian astronomer Nikolai Chernykh at the Crimean Astrophysical Observatory in Nauchnyj on the Crimean peninsula. It was named after the Apollo–Soyuz Test Project.

Orbit and classification 

The dark C-type asteroid is a member of the Themis family, a dynamical family of outer-belt asteroids with nearly coplanar ecliptical orbits. It orbits the Sun in the outer main-belt at a distance of 2.6–3.7 AU once every 5 years and 7 months (2,029 days). Its orbit has an eccentricity of 0.18 and an inclination of 2° with respect to the ecliptic.

Physical characteristics 

It has a rotation period of 5.4 hours and an albedo of 0.10 and 0.11, as determined by the space-based Akari and WISE missions, respectively, while the Collaborative Asteroid Lightcurve Link (CALL) assumes a lower albedo of 0.08.

Naming 

This minor planet was named after the joint Soviet-American space flight, the Apollo–Soyuz Test Project, carried on in 1975. The reversal of the names, "Soyuz–Apollo" rather than "Apollo–Soyuz", was not political, but to prevent confusion with the asteroid 1862 Apollo. The official naming citation was published by the Minor Planet Center on 1 March 1981.

References

External links 
 Asteroid Lightcurve Database (LCDB), query form (info )
 Dictionary of Minor Planet Names, Google books
 Asteroids and comets rotation curves, CdR – Observatoire de Genève, Raoul Behrend
 Discovery Circumstances: Numbered Minor Planets (1)-(5000)  – Minor Planet Center
 
 

002228
Discoveries by Nikolai Chernykh
Named minor planets
2228
19770719